The 22443 / 22444 Kanpur Central–Bandra Terminus Weekly Express is a Express train belonging to North Central Railway zone that runs between  and  in India. It is currently being operated with 22443/22444 train numbers on a weekly basis.

Service

22443/Kanpur Central–Bandra Terminus Weekly Express has an average speed of 56 km/hr and covers 1615 km in 28h 45m.
22444/Bandra Terminus–Kanpur Central Weekly Express has an average speed of 59 km/hr and covers 1615 km in 27h 25m.

Route & halts

The important halts of the train are:

Coach composition

The train has standard ICF rakes with max speed of 110 kmph. The train consists of 18 coaches:

 1 AC II Tier
 4 AC III Tier
 5 Sleeper coaches
 6 General Unreserved
 2 Seating cum Luggage Rake

Schedule

Traction

The route is now fully electrified, both trains are hauled by a Kanpur-based WAP-7 (HOG)-equipped locomotive from Kanpur to Bandra Terminus and vice versa.

Direction reversal

Train reverses its direction 1 times:

Rake sharing

The train shares its rake with; 
 14151/14152 Kanpur Central–Anand Vihar Terminal Express  
 22445/22446 Kanpur Central–Amritsar Weekly Express.

See also 

 Kanpur Central railway station
 Bandra Terminus railway station

Notes

References

External links 

 22443/Kanpur Central–Bandra Terminus Weekly Express India Rail Info
 22444/Bandra Terminus–Kanpur Central Weekly Express India Rail Info

Transport in Mumbai
Trains from Kanpur
Express trains in India
Rail transport in Rajasthan
Rail transport in Madhya Pradesh
Rail transport in Gujarat
Rail transport in Maharashtra
Railway services introduced in 2015